Durham is a town in Androscoggin County, Maine, United States.  The population was 4,173 at the 2020 census. It is included in both the Lewiston-Auburn, Maine Metropolitan Statistical Area and the Lewiston-Auburn, Maine Metropolitan New England City and Town Area.

History

Durham was named after County Durham, England, the ancestral home of the town's first settler. It was previously known as Royallsborough, named after Isaac Royall Jr.

Geography

Durham is bordered by Pownal, Auburn, Freeport, New Gloucester, and Brunswick.

Durham is considered a "gateway" town because it connects two major Maine communities, the Greater Portland Area with the Lewiston–Auburn Area.

Climate

Demographics

2010 census

As of the census of 2010, there were 3,848 people, 1,496 households, and 1,143 families living in the town. The racial makeup of the town was 97.8% White, 0.3% African American, 0.1% Native American, 0.5% Asian, 0.2% from other races, and 1.0% from two or more races. Hispanic or Latino of any race were 0.8% of the population.

There were 1,496 households, of which 33.5% had children under the age of 18 living with them, 63.6% were married couples living together, 7.5% had a female householder with no husband present, 5.3% had a male householder with no wife present, and 23.6% were non-families. 16.6% of all households were made up of individuals, and 4% had someone living alone who was 65 years of age or older. The average household size was 2.57 and the average family size was 2.85.

The median age in the town was 41.2 years. 22.3% of residents were under the age of 18; 5.5% were between the ages of 18 and 24; 29.1% were from 25 to 44; 33.8% were from 45 to 64; and 9.3% were 65 years of age or older. The gender makeup of the town was 50.6% male and 49.4% female.

2000 census

As of the census of 2000, there were 3,381 people, 1,226 households, and 980 families living in the town. The racial makeup of the town was 98.96% White, 0.12% African American, 0.15% Native American, 0.27% Asian, 0.09% from other races, and 0.41% from two or more races. Hispanic or Latino of any race were 0.65% of the population.

There were 1,226 households, out of which 38.9% had children under the age of 18 living with them, 70.6% were married couples living together, 5.9% had a female householder with no husband present, and 20.0% were non-families. 12.4% of all households were made up of individuals, and 3.0% had someone living alone who was 65 years of age or older.  The average household size was 2.75 and the average family size was 3.02.

In the town, the population was spread out, with 26.9% under the age of 18, 5.2% from 18 to 24, 35.5% from 25 to 44, 25.5% from 45 to 64, and 6.8% who were 65 years of age or older.  The median age was 37 years. For every 100 females, there were 99.5 males.  For every 100 females age 18 and over, there were 99.2 males.

The median income for a household in the town was $53,846, and the median income for a family was $55,028. Males had a median income of $35,174 versus $28,342 for females. The per capita income for the town was $20,883.  About 5.9% of families and 6.6% of the population were below the poverty line, including 8.2% of those under age 18 and 9.8% of those age 65 or over.

Voter registration

Government

Durham is in Maine's 2nd congressional district, Maine Senate District 22, and Maine House of Representatives District 46.

Education

Durham Community School is a public school operated by the Durham School Department. The school provides for the education of students in grades K through 8.
Education of a majority of the students in grades 9 through 12 is provided by Freeport High School.
Durham is a part of Regional School Unit #5, Becky Foley is the Superintendent.

Amenities

The privately owned Margerison Airport is located between Hallowell Road and Royalsborough Road, just north of Rabbit Road. Its FAA identifier is ME75, and it was activated in 1979. It has two unpaved runways—headings 9/27 and 15/33. Its area control center is Boston Center, while its flight service station is Bangor.

The Bliss Farm Inn, located at 1290 Royalsborough Road in the historic Bagley-Bliss farmhouse, provides upscale guest rooms year round and fine dining on weekends during the off-season.

Notable people 

 Edward H. Hill, founder of Central Maine Medical Center
 Stephen King, spent part of his childhood in Durham. He based the fictional town of Jerusalem's Lot on it
 Frank Sandford, founder and leader of an apocalyptic Christian sect known as "The Kingdom"

References

External links
 Town of Durham, Maine
 

 
Towns in Androscoggin County, Maine
Towns in Maine